Ruaidrí Mac Duinn Sléibe (Modern Irish: Ruairí mac Donnsliabh), anglicised as Rory MacDonlevy (c. 1134-1201), was a Dál Fiatach King of Ulaid (Ulster) of the MacDonlevy branch based in Downpatrick. He was the last native Gaelic King of Ulster. The youngest son of powerful  overking Cú Ulad mac Conchobair mac Duinn Sléibe, known as Cú Ulad “the Hound of Ulster”.  In 1173 Ruaidrí succeeded his elder brother Donnsléibe as overking until 1201 when he was ultimately defeated by the Norman forces of Sir John de Courcy who established the Earldom of Ulster.

References

Kings of Ulster
1130s births
1201 deaths

Year of birth uncertain